Leucochloridium paradoxum, the green-banded broodsac, is a parasitic flatworm (or helminth). Its intermediate hosts are land snails, usually of the genus Succinea. The pulsating, green broodsacs fill the eye stalks of the snail, thereby attracting predation by birds, the primary host. These broodsacs visually imitate caterpillars, a prey of birds. The adult parasite lives in the bird's cloaca, releasing its eggs into the faeces.

Life cycle
The species in Leucochloridium share a similar life cycle. They are parasites of snails and birds. This is a truncated life cycle compared with typical trematodes, because the snail acts as both the first and second intermediate host.

Eggs ingested by the snail hatch into miracidia, which develop in the snail's hepatopancreas into the next stage, a sporocyst. The mature sporocyst consists of a number of branches spreading through the haemocoel and may make up a fifth or more of the snail's weight. Some of the branches develop into long tubes ending in a swollen broodsac, but these are staggered in their states of development, so that normally only 2 or 3 are mature simultaneously. One or both of the snail's tentacles become occupied by a mature broodsac, which transforms the appearance. The tentacle is swollen and the pulsating, colourful, banded broodsac visible inside mimics the appearance of an insect larva like a caterpillar. This encourages their consumption by the next host, insectivorous birds. Observations in captivity indicated that birds tore the broodsac out of the snail before eating it, so the snail may survive this. Birds may also become infected by eating broodsacs that have spontaneously burst from the tentacle, surviving for an hour whilst they continue to pulsate. 

At their base, the sporocysts produce asexually many tail-less cercariae, which develop directly into metacercariae within the sporocyst, depositing a thick mucoid coat around themselves. The mature metacercariae are oval in shape, 1.2 × 0.8 mm; typically 100–250 such metacercariae accumulate in a broodsac. If the broodsac is eaten by a bird, the metacercariae pass along its alimentary tract, and lodge in the cloaca. This form has two suckers on the ventral side, which anchor it to the cloacal wall, and a smooth dorsal surface. The adults are hermaphroditic and release eggs into the bird's faeces. Some will be eaten by a snail, thus completing the life cycle.

In a study in Russia, snails became infected in spring and summer. The resultant sporocysts were producing infective metacercariae in the following spring but then died in late summer. The lifetime of the adult stage in its bird host is believed to be of the order of weeks or months.

Behaviour of the broodsacs and infected snails

The pulsations of the broodsacs typically vary from 40 to 75 times a minute depending on temperature, but they cease in the dark.   

The parasite manipulates the snail host's behaviour in a way likely to make it more conspicuous to birds. In one study of Succinea putris hosts, infected snails stayed in better lit places for longer, sat on higher vegetation, and were more mobile. Whereas 53% of infected snails remained fully exposed for the 45 minutes of the observation period, the figure was only 28% for the controls (nearby snails without Leucochloridium broodsacs). Infected snails may survive for at least a year and continue to be able to use the eyes on the ends of their tentacles. Although snails infected by other Leucochloridium species are reported to continue to reproduce, snails infected by L. paradoxum often show a reduction of the sexual organs. 

The appearance and behaviour of the sporocysts is a case of aggressive mimicry, where the parasite vaguely resembles the food of the host, thereby gaining the parasite entry into the host's body by being eaten. This is unlike most other cases of aggressive mimicry, in which the mimic eats the duped animal.

Taxonomy 
In older literature, L. paradoxum may be referred to as L. macrostomum, derived from Rudolphi's 1803 description of Fasciola distomum, which he later renamed Distomum macrostomum. Subsequently it was shown that L. paradoxum is a different species; Rudolphi's species is now in the genus Urogonimus. Leucochloridium heckerti Kagan, 1951 is also considered a synonym of L. paradoxum.

Identification
The easiest way to differentiate between Leucochloridium species is from the appearance of the broodsacs in the tentacle of the host snail. Leucochloridium paradoxum exhibits broodsacs that have green bands with dark brown and black spots, and with a dark-brown or reddish-brown tip. Nowadays this method of identification may be supported with ribosomal DNA sequences. A snail may be simultaneously infected by more than one species of Leucochloridium.

The adults, found in the cloaca of birds, are less well known, so that distinguishing the species is less straightforward.

Habitat 
Leucochlordium paradoxum is found in moist areas, such as marshes, where the usual intermediate host Succinea snails are found.

Distribution 

Leucochloridium paradoxum was originally described based on its sporocyst stage, collected from an island in the river Elbe at Pillnitz, near Dresden, Germany. Other known locations are Poland, Belarus, the St Petersburg area of Russia, Denmark, Sweden, Norway, the Netherlands, the UK and Japan. It is believed to be the species of Leuchochloridium infecting an endemic species of semi-slug on Robinson Crusoe Island in the Pacific, the only record from the Southern Hemisphere.

Hosts 
Intermediate hosts:
 Succinea putris
 Succinea lauta
 Omalonyx gayana
Hosts:
 Birds
 Zebra finch (Taeniopygia guttata) – experimental

References

External links

 Distome (Leucochloridium paradoxum), The Living World of Molluscs

Diplostomida
Parasites of molluscs
Suicide-inducing parasitism
Animals described in 1835
Articles containing video clips